Abhay (The Fearless) is an Indian children's film. Directed by famous TV host and actor Annu Kapoor, the movie stars many known Bollywood faces including Nana Patekar, Benjamin Gelani and Moon Moon Sen and has music by Vishal Bharadwaj.

Synopsis
The Nayaks disregard rumours that the house they have moved into is haunted by the ghost of its former owner Rana. Their three children take delight in these ghost stories and desire to meet the ghost. Meanwhile, Rana and his fellow ghost, unhappy with this intrusion, plot to scare the new owners. As the living pit their wits against the ghosts, secrets tumble that will not just shed more light on the ghosts’ pasts, but also show that children are not meek creatures to be cowed down by the fear of the unknown.

Cast
 Nana Patekar as Rana Digvijay Singh
 Mayank Sharma as Rahul Nayak
 Eka Lakhani as Priyanka Nayak
 Ankit Desai as Ishan Nayak
 Moon Moon Sen
 Benjamin Gilani

Awards
The film won Best Children’s Film – Swarna Kamal Award at the 42nd National Film Awards held in 1994 and director Annu Kapoor won the Best Director – V. Shantaram Award.

References

External links
 

1994 films
Indian children's films
1990s Hindi-language films
Films scored by Vishal Bhardwaj
Best Children's Film National Film Award winners
1990s children's films